Pippo Campanini (born 1907, date of death unknown) was an Italian actor. In 1970 he starred in Bernardo Bertolucci's The Spider's Stratagem and in 1976 also appeared in Bertolucci's 1900.

References

External links 
 

Italian male film actors
20th-century Italian male actors
1907 births
Year of death missing